Arrowwood is a village in Vulcan County, Alberta, Canada.

The community takes its name from nearby East Arrowwood Creek.

Demographics 

In the 2016 Census of Population conducted by Statistics Canada, the Village of Arrowwood recorded a population of 207 living in 72 of its 79 total private dwellings, a  change from its 2011 population of 188.

Government 
The village is governed by a village council consisting of a mayor and two councillors, and is administrated by a village administrator. Municipal elections are held every four years.

Notable people 
The Canadian-American actress Joyce Meadows was born in Arrowwood but left the village in her early childhood.

See also 
 List of communities in Alberta
 List of villages in Alberta

References

Bibliography

External links 

1926 establishments in Alberta
Villages in Alberta
Vulcan County